Mazarin is the fourth studio album by Swedish pop musician Per Gessle, released on 16 June 2003.

Per Gessle thought of this album as his little side project from Roxette, but it turned out to be a huge success, subsequently being certified 5× platinum status in Sweden. He also played some of the songs from it on the Gyllene Tider's Finn 5 fel! tour in 2004, despite the fact that they were not Gyllene Tider songs.

Critical reception

Mazarin was well received by Swedish publications, with Aftonbladet and Expressen both highly praising the album.

Track listing
 "Vilket håll du än går" — 3:18
 "Om du bara vill" — 3:47
 "På promenad genom stan" — 3:21
 "Smakar på ett regn" — 3:27
 "Gungar" — 3:37
 "Födelsedag" — 3:13
 "Sakta mina steg" — 2:35
 "Tycker om när du tar på mej" — 3:27
 "Spegelboll" — 3:31
 "För bra för att vara sant" — 3:29
 "Här kommer alla känslorna (på en och samma gång)" — 2:43
 "Jag tror du bär på en stor hemlighet" — 3:59
 "Varmt igen" — 4:21
 "Mazarin" (instrumental) — 3:23

Charts

Weekly charts

Year-end charts

Certifications and sales

References

2003 albums
Per Gessle albums
Swedish-language albums